The 46th Arizona State Legislature, consisting of the Arizona State Senate and the Arizona House of Representatives, was constituted in Phoenix from January 1, 2003, to December 31, 2004, during the first two years of Janet Napolitano's first term in office. Both the Senate and the House membership remained constant at 30 and 60, respectively. The Republicans gained two seats in the Senate, giving them a 17-13 majority. The Republicans gained four seats in the House, maintaining their majority in the lower chamber, 39–20-1, with a single representative switching their party affiliation from Democrat to Independent after the election.

Sessions
The Legislature met for two regular sessions at the State Capitol in Phoenix. The first opened on January 13, 2003, and adjourned on June 19, while the Second Regular Session convened on January 12, 2004, and adjourned sine die on May 26.

There were two Special Sessions, the first of which was convened on March 17, 2003, and adjourned later on the same day; and the second convened on October 20, 2003, and adjourned sine die on December 13.

State Senate

Members

The asterisk (*) denotes members of the previous Legislature who continued in office as members of this Legislature.

House of Representatives

Members 
The asterisk (*) denotes members of the previous Legislature who continued in office as members of this Legislature.

References

Arizona legislative sessions
2003 in Arizona
2004 in Arizona
2003 U.S. legislative sessions
2004 U.S. legislative sessions